Christine Hayes is an American academic and scholar of Jewish studies, currently serving as the Sterling Professor of Religious Studies in Classical Judaica at Yale University, specializing in Talmudic and Midrashic studies and Classical Judaica.

Before her appointment at Yale, she served as the assistant professor of Hebrew studies, Department of Near Eastern Studies, at Princeton University, where she completed her first book Between the Babylonian and Palestinian Talmuds (1997) based on her PhD work. Her first monograph was awarded the Salo Baron prize from the American Academy for Jewish Research.

Her second monograph, Gentile Impurities and Jewish Identities (2006), was a finalist for the National Jewish Book award, and her third monograph, What's Divine about Divine Law? Early Perspectives, has won three prestigious awards. From 2017–2019, Hayes served as President of the Association for Jewish Studies.

Early life and education 
Hayes was born to Australian parents living in the United States. According to Hayes, the family moved frequently in her early years. When Hayes was 11 years old her parents decided to return home to Australia, moving the family first to Sydney and then to Adelaide where Hayes completed her secondary education.

She credits her parents' interest in philosophy, religion, literature, and world culture as instrumental in shaping her own intellectual passions, including her eventual study of Jewish history, culture, and religion.

Upon finishing high school, Hayes returned to the United States to study at Harvard University and received her B.A. summa cum laude in the Study of Religion in 1984. There, Hayes relates that she stumbled into the Harvard University Hillel and began to teach herself to read Hebrew.

She interrupted her undergraduate studies in 1982 and worked as a volunteer on an Israeli Kibbutz. After two years of working in the non-profit sector, Hayes returned to academia in 1986, pursuing a doctorate in Classical (biblical and rabbinic) Judaism through the Department of Near Eastern Studies at UC Berkeley. She spent the 1987–88 academic year as an exchange student at the Hebrew University in Jerusalem.

Hayes earned an M.A. in 1988, and a PhD in 1993. Her PhD dissertation, "Between the Babylonian and Palestinian Talmuds: Accounting for Halakhic difference in selected Sugyot from tractate Avodah Zarah" sought to compare and account for halakhic differences between the two Talmuds.

Career 
In 1993, Hayes was appointed Assistant Professor of Hebrew Studies in the Department of Near Eastern Languages and Civilizations at Princeton University. In 1996, she became an Assistant Professor in the Department of Religious Studies at Yale University where she gained tenure in 2002.

Hayes was awarded a New Directions Fellowship from the Andrew W. Mellon Foundation in 2003 that enabled her to pursue studies in legal history and legal theory.

In 2006, Hayes' Introduction to Hebrew Bible course was selected by Yale as a pilot for the university's Open Courses online platform allowing anyone around the world to access course materials and recordings of the lectures.

In addition to publishing numerous books and publications, Hayes has also dedicated time to institutions supporting Jewish Studies research and scholarship. Hayes has been a visiting professor at the Tel Aviv University Faculty of Law (2015), a visiting professor at the University of Pennsylvania Law School (2018), and a fellow at the Katz Center for Advanced Judaic Studies (2018). Since 2015, she has been a Senior Faculty Fellow at the Shalom Hartman Institute of North America.

From 2012 to 2016, Hayes served as the co-editor of the Association of Jewish Studies Review. In 2017, she was elected president of the Association for Jewish Studies.

In 2021 Hayes was named a Sterling Professor, one of the highest academic honors that Yale University bestows.

Scholarship 
Hayes' scholarship addresses a wide range of historical, literary, legal, and philosophical topics in biblical and rabbinic literature.

Her second book, Gentile Impurities and Jewish Identities: Intermarriage and Conversion from the Bible to the Talmud, is a work of cultural history. It examines the diverse ways in which biblical, Second Temple, and rabbinic sources employ purity language to construct Jewish identity and to inscribe and police community boundaries with varying degrees of porousness.

Her most recent book, What's Divine about Divine Law? Early Perspectives, traces two radically distinct conceptions of divine law—Greco-Roman natural law grounded in reason and biblical law grounded in divine will—that emerged in antiquity and confronted one another in the Hellenistic period. According to Hayes, their confrontation created a cognitive dissonance for those who felt compelled to negotiate the claims of both traditions. In a series of interconnected close readings, Hayes charts the creative and conflicting responses to this cognitive dissonance. Second Temple and Hellenistic Jewish authors sought to minimize the distance between classical and biblical understandings of divine law by attributing to the Torah the qualities deemed definitive of the divine natural law of Stoic tradition: truth, rationality, universality, and immutability. By contrast, Paul sought to widen the gap, representing the Torah of Moses as possessing none of the traits of the Hellenistic divine/natural law and all of the traits of conventional positive law. Hayes argues that a third path was taken by the Talmudic rabbis, whose unique and surprising construction of divine law—as dynamic, mutable, and not necessarily rational or allied with a monistic "truth"—resisted the Hellenistic and Pauline conceptions that would come to dominate the Christianized west.

Personal life 
In 1988 Hayes married Michael Della Rocca (a professor of philosophy at Yale University). They have two sons.

Selected publications

Books 
 
 Introduction to the Bible. New Haven, Conn: Yale University Press, 2012.

Notes

References

External links 

Living people
Place of birth missing (living people)
Harvard University alumni
American biblical scholars
University of California, Berkeley alumni
Yale University faculty
Historians of Jews and Judaism
American historians of religion
Female biblical scholars
Talmudists
1960 births